Memecylon hullettii is a species of plant in the family Melastomataceae. It is endemic to Peninsular Malaysia. It is threatened by habitat loss.

References

hullettii
Endemic flora of Peninsular Malaysia
Vulnerable plants
Taxonomy articles created by Polbot